Eupithecia aradjouna is a moth in the family Geometridae. It is found in Iran.

Taxonomy
Subspecies Eupithecia aradjouna taftanica is now considered a synonym of Eupithecia frontosa.

References

Moths described in 1938
aradjouna
Moths of the Middle East